Chicoreus dodongi is a species of sea snail, a marine gastropod mollusk in the family Muricidae, the murex snails or rock snails.

Description

Distribution
This marine species occurs off the Philippines.

References

 Houart R. (1995) Description of a new species of Chicoreus (Triplex) from the Philippine Islands. Apex 10(1): 1-3.

External links
 MNHN, Paris: holotype

Muricidae
Gastropods described in 1995